Pilchowo may refer to the following places in north-west Poland:
Pilchowo, Police County
Pilchowo, Szczecin